"Lens" is a 2012 song by Canadian-American recording artist Alanis Morissette, released as the second single from her eighth studio album, Havoc and Bright Lights. The song was written by Morissette and Guy Sigsworth, and produced by Sigsworth and Joe Chiccarelli. The song was played at most shows of Guardian Angel Tour.

Music video 

The music video was released on May 13, 2013, almost a year after the release of the single. Directed by Victor Indrizzo, the video is an amalgamation of scenes Alanis in Israel with backstage footage from their last tour. Despite being the third video, the song was the second single from the album.

Track listing 
Digital download
 "Lens" – 4:08

2012 singles
Songs written by Alanis Morissette
Rock ballads
2012 songs
Songs written by Guy Sigsworth
Song recordings produced by Guy Sigsworth